The 2013 K League Classic was the 31st season of the top division of South Korean professional football. The South Korean professional football league, K League, was split into two divisions since this year, and the top division was named the "K League Classic". Its fixtures were announced on 30 January, and began on 2 March.

Teams

General information

Managerial changes

Foreign players
Restricting the number of foreign players strictly to four per team, including a slot for a player from AFC countries. A team could use four foreign players on the field each game including a least one player from the AFC country.

League table

Positions by matchday

Round 1–26

Round 27–40

Results

Matches 1–26

Matches 27–40

Group A

Group B

Relegation playoffs

Player statistics

Top scorers

Top assist providers

Awards
The 2013 K League Awards was held on 3 December 2013.

Main awards 

Source:

Best XI 

Source:

Attendance

See also
2013 in South Korean football
2013 K League Challenge
2013 Korean FA Cup

References

External links
Official website 
Review at K League 

K League Classic seasons
1
South Korea
South Korea